Jeannette "Jeany" Spark (born 7 November 1982) is an English actress, known for portraying Linda Wallander in the British television series Wallander. The actress has also had significant roles in the comedy series Man Down and the drama series The Interceptor.

Early life and schooling
Spark studied English literature at Lady Margaret Hall, Oxford, graduating with a First Class Honours degree in 2004. She then trained as an actress at the Royal Academy of Dramatic Art, graduating in 2007.

TV acting career
In 2008, Spark played school teacher Mercy Chant in the BBC adaptation of Thomas Hardy's Tess of the D’Urbervilles. Spark also took on the role of Linda Wallander, the daughter of the titular character in the BBC One drama Wallander.

In 2011 Spark portrayed Joan Malin in the television drama film Hattie. In 2013, she took the role of the deputy headmistress, Emma, in Man Down, the Channel 4 comedy series. The show lasted for four series.

Spark plays the role of Detective Inspector Kate Gemmill in the 2015 BBC drama The Interceptor. In 2016, Spark joined the cast of the ITV drama Jericho.

In 2018, she appeared as Captain Sandrine Shaw in the BBC Two miniseries Collateral. In 2020, Spark was cast as Kate in the Channel 4 drama I am Hannah starring Gemma Chan.

Stage acting career
In 2017, Spark took the lead role in the Theatr Clwyd's production of Skylight, a play by David Hare.
In 2019, she appeared for the Royal Shakespeare Company in Crooked Dances as the character Katy Porlock, a new play by Robin French.

References

External links
 

1982 births
Alumni of Lady Margaret Hall, Oxford
Alumni of RADA
English television actresses
Living people
Place of birth missing (living people)